The Iveco Zeta is a light to medium-duty truck model produced by the Italian manufacturer Iveco. Appearing in 1976 and entering production in 1977, its cab was developed with the aid of Fiat's wind tunnel in Orbassano. The Lupetto, as well as the Leoncino, the Daino, and the Tigrotto, were all replaced by the OM X-series in 1972, which then formed the basis for the Zeta range. The Zeta itself was replaced by the all-new Iveco Eurocargo in 1991.

Development
It was originally sold with either Fiat or OM badging, with a number indicating the gross tonnage (OM 50-100). It was essentially just a restyling of the earlier S-series. In France it was marketed by Unic (part of Fiat since 1966 and merged with Iveco in 1975), in Germany as a Magirus-Deutz (with air-cooled Deutz engines), and in Switzerland as a Saurer-OM or Saurer-Fiat, also available with a Saurer engine. The range then gradually began using the unified Iveco name in 1979 (retaining a hyphenated "OM" or "Fiat" during the transition). This process was finished by 1982. After Iveco took over Ford's European truck operations in 1986, the Zeta appeared with combined Ford and Iveco badging in the United Kingdom. Even after the Iveco nameplate gained prominency (center grille), secondary "Fiat" or "Magirus" or other badging still appeared in the bottom left corner of the grille, depending on the market.

The Zeta was issued in a myriad configurations, as it had to replace a variety of existing truck lines from several different producers. Originally three different engines and four different wheelbases were offered. Single or double cabins as well as a number of van models with an available raised roof were available. A tilting cab was offered on the 7.9 ton "79" and was standard on heavier models. The range received a light facelift and model shuffle in 1979. Later more engines were added, as well as models which were tailored to suit various local markets. Iveco's naming system during the Zeta's production consisted of two sets of numbers divided by a period: the first digits reflected the gross vehicle weight (GVW) in hundreds of kilograms, while the second set reflected the power in tens of horsepower. Thus, a five-tonner with the  engine carries 50.10 badging. There was also a tractor unit version of the 50.10 available.

Magirus-Deutz models
Versions with the   air-cooled Deutz F4L913 engine were called 90D or 90M, with the GVW (in tonnes) following - the range reaching from the 90D5,2 to the 90M7,9. "D" or "M" refers to the cab - in most cases, Ulm-developed designs carried a D while external designs such as the Club of Four carry an M. It is unknown why both letters were used concurrently on the Zeta cab. In 1983, the Deutz-engined models were discontinued.

TurboZeta

In 1987 the turbocharged Iveco TurboZeta arrived. This had turbocharged versions of the 3.9 litre four-cylinder Iveco 8040 engine with either . The TurboZeta was facelifted somewhat and received more aerodynamic, rectangular headlights. These later found their way into the remainder of the range. The TurboZeta and Zeta were also license built by Zastava Kamioni in Kragujevac, in the former Yugoslav republic. Zastava built the truck until at least 2012, and they were exported through Iveco channels to many markets. Since 2004 it has been sold as the EuroZeta, after a facelift and updates to meet the then current Euro III emissions standards. More recent versions (85.14) have a  Cummins diesel engine which meets the Euro IV emissions requirements. The Zeta was also built in Turkey, by Otoyol Sanayi of the Koç Group, from 1990 until 2006. Late, heavier-duty Otoyol Ivecos had their headlight openings blanked and the lamps placed below instead, in the bumper.

In the United States, Iveco Trucks of North America offered the TurboZeta under the EuroTurbo name in the 1980s, until the Company ended their North American sales in mid-1991. The Class 3 EuroTurbo 12-12 had a  four-cylinder turbodiesel engine while the 10-14, 12-14, 15-14, and 18-14 all have a  six-cylinder engine. The 23-16 was the only Class 6 model and received a  inline-six.

The Zeta was gradually replaced from beneath by the heavier versions in the S-series (Daily), and at the top by the lighter duty Ford Cargos (which were sold as Iveco-Fords in some markets, beginning in 1986). In Germany and some other markets, the Iveco-Magirus MK range (Club of Four) also encroached at the top end of the Zeta range. Eventually, in 1991, the all new Eurocargo replaced the remainder of the Zeta range in most Western markets. While large numbers of Zetas were built over a fairly long production life, not many remain in Western Europe. Always built down to a price (and often with indifferent rust protection) they were usually disposed of at the end of their working life. As they look a bit too modern for most classic truck collectors, most remaining European Zetas will likely end up crushed or exported.

Gallery

References

Zeta
Cab over vehicles
Vehicles introduced in 1977